Push Rewind is the debut solo album by American pop singer Chris Wallace. It was released digitally on September 4, 2012.

The album was taken off iTunes in late 2013 and was re-released on March 4, 2014.

Background
After Wallace' previous band, The White Tie Affair broke up, he began working on a solo album.

On August 23, 2012, Wallace tweeted that his first solo album, Push Rewind, would be available on iTunes on September 4. On September 4, 2012, his debut solo album was released via ThinkSay Records.

Release and promotion

Singles
"Remember When (Push Rewind)" was released as the lead single off the album on June 12, 2012. The song was available for free for the week of September 4, 2012 as iTunes' Single of the Week to help promote the album. The song reached number 2 on the Billboard Bubbling Under Hot 100.

"Keep Me Crazy" was announced as the second single from the album.  It was originally released to mainstream pop radio on April 22, 2013 but it was re-released on July 30, 2013.

Track listing

Release history

References

2012 debut albums